Justin Craig is a production designer, set decorator, art director and actor. He is nominated for a Genie Award for Best Achievement in Art Direction/Production Design for Shake Hands with the Devil (with Lindsey Hermer-Bell).

Recognition 
 2007 Genie Award for Best Achievement in Art Direction/Production Design - Shake Hands with the Devil

External links 
 

Canadian male television actors
Canadian art directors
Living people
Canadian production designers
Canadian set decorators
Year of birth missing (living people)